Daosheng Christ's Church, more commonly known as Daosheng Church, is a Protestant church located on North Zhongshan Road, in Gulou District, Nanjing, Jiangsu, China.

History 
The church was founded by the Protestant Episcopal Church Mission in 1915 with Chinese architecture style. The church was closed in 1958 and used as the Library of Nanjing No.12 High School. On 18 December 2008, the church held a foundation laying ceremony of its new building in Hekou Gate Park. It was classified as a municipal cultural relic preservation organ by the Nanjing government in 1992 and a provincial cultural relic preservation organ by the Jiangsu government 2019.

References 

Churches in Nanjing
1915 establishments in China
Churches completed in 1915
Tourist attractions in Nanjing
Protestant churches in China